Pranava Prakash (born in Patna in 1979) is an Indian artist working in neopop style. He is known for helping to create the "tuchchart" style with a group of Delhi artists, which he debuted in a 2007 show in Delhi entitled "Tuchchart".Prakash is also known for drawing inspiration for his works from various sociopolitical issues such as xenophobia, frequently depicting various persons in the nude.

Background
Prakash was born in Patna, Bihar, India in 1979 and attended the Institute of Management Technology, Ghaziabad and Nalanda Medical College in Patna, where he graduated with an MBA and a MBBS.

Controversies
Prakash has received controversy over some of his works, with some of the galleries featuring his paintings being vandalized and Prakash himself being assaulted over the depiction of nude celebrities. Other paintings that have received controversy include his Your Turn painting, which depicted Indian painter M.F. Husain in the nude. Prakash stated that he had been inspired to paint the picture due to the reactions of several female painters over Husain's "depiction of the fairer sex in uncompromising positions". He had attempted to submit the painting for showings and was repeatedly rejected until its appearance in the AIFACS gallery in New Delhi.

His painting Goddess of Fifteen Minutes of fame also received criticism for depicted Arundhati Roy, Osama Bin Laden, and Chairman Mao Zedong in the nude. Opinions on the work differed, with some seeing the work as creative expression while the painting prompted the Lalit Kala Academy to cancel a scheduled showing with him. The decision was protested by the group Socio Pop, who burnt a paint brush and stated they would abstain from painting until Prakash's work was shown.

RadhaMohan Award
Prakash got annual award for 2013 in painting category, instated by the government of Bihar at Patna by Chief Minister Nitish Kumar. The citation mentioned his contribution of ‘Your Turning’ and ‘Goddess of Fifteen Minutes of fame’ which raised debate.

References

Further reading
Sanjay Singh "Pop art directions in India", Delhi, Artworks Press, Jan 2008 p. 117
Shashi Shwetima "Tucchart: A new wave"   Delhi, Zennit Press, Nov. 2007 p. 15
Anil Sinha "New Millenium : New Art" Kolkata, Reco art India, March 2008 p. 48

External links
 Official website

Indian contemporary painters
Living people
1979 births
Artists from Patna
Magadh University alumni
Institute of Management Technology, Ghaziabad alumni
Painters from Bihar